Sanyukta Kaza is an Indian film editor best known for her work on TUMBBAD, Bhediya, Paatal lok and Ship of Theseus. Her films have won accolades at multiple film festivals such as Cannes, Venice, Sundance, Toronto, Sitges, Screamfest, Palm springs etc. She has a Masters in Fine Arts from Chapman university.

Career 

Sanyukta Kaza started editing films with Ship of Theseus. Her first feature film won the National Award for Best Film and was selected as one of the '15 life-changing films of all time’ chosen by the British Film Institute.

Her other works include Tumbbad, Sudip Sharma's Pataal lok, Amar Kaushik's Bhediya, Anand Tiwari's Bang Baajaa Baarat, Abhishek Chaubey's Madhyantar, Varun Grover's AIR , Avinash Arun's Three of Us, Deepti and Fahad's My Love: Six stories of Love and Anand Tiwari's Love Per Square Foot amongst much more.

Filmography

External links 
 

Year of birth missing (living people)
Living people
Indian film editors
Chapman University alumni
Indian women film editors
Indian expatriates in the United States